Richard Donovan may refer to:

 Richard Donovan (speed skater) (1901–1985), American speed skater
 Richard J. Donovan, member of the California legislature
 Dick Donovan (1927–1997), Major League Baseball pitcher
 Richard Donovan (runner) (born c. 1966), Irish runner and marathoner
 Richard II O'Donovan (died 1829), Irish general
 Rich Donovan, expert in business development issues surrounding disability and accessibility